Lorraine Michael Gensman (August 26, 1878 – May 27, 1954) was a U.S. Representative from Oklahoma.

Biography
Born on a farm near Wichita, Kansas, on August 26, 1878, Gensman was the son of Nicholas and Kansas Osborne Gensman. He attended the public schools, the Garden Plains Grade School, Wichita Commercial College, Lewis Academy, and the Kansas State Normal School at Emporia. He was Principal of the Andale, Kansas schools in 1896 and 1897. He graduated from the University of Kansas School of Law at Lawrence, Kansas in 1901, and was admitted to the bar the same year. He married fellow University of Kansas graduate Lucia Van Cleef on April 6, 1904.

Career
Gensman began practice in Lawrence, Kansas; then moved to Lawton, Oklahoma in 1901, resuming his practice there. He served as Referee in Bankruptcy from 1902 to 1907. He served as prosecuting attorney of Comanche County in 1918 and 1919.

Elected as a Republican to the 67th Congress, Gensman served from March 4, 1921 to March 4, 1923. He was an unsuccessful candidate for reelection in 1922 to the 68th Congress and for election in 1936 to the 75th Congress. He served as delegate to the Republican National Convention in 1924. He engaged in the oil business, and resumed the practice of law until his retirement in 1953.

Death
Gensman died in Lawton, Comanche County, Oklahoma, on May 27, 1954 (age 75 years, 274 days). He is interred at Highland Cemetery, Lawton, Oklahoma.

References

External links
 Encyclopedia of Oklahoma History and Culture - Gensman, L. M.

 Lorraine M. Gensman Collection at the Carl Albert Center

1878 births
1954 deaths
People from Sedgwick County, Kansas
Emporia State University alumni
University of Kansas alumni
Kansas lawyers
Oklahoma lawyers
Republican Party members of the United States House of Representatives from Oklahoma